Martha's Vineyard Airport  is a public airport located in the middle of the island of Martha's Vineyard, three miles (5 km) south of the central business district of Vineyard Haven, in Dukes County, Massachusetts, United States. This airport is owned by Dukes County and lies on the border between the towns of West Tisbury and Edgartown.

It is the largest of three airports and the only one on the island served by airlines. In addition to service from six commercial airlines, it is used by a significant number of general aviation aircraft. The other airports on the Island are Katama Airpark and Trade Wind Airport.

The airport identifier MVY has entered into general use as an abbreviation for the island of Martha's Vineyard and is often used for non-aviation purposes.

Terminal and facilities

Martha's Vineyard Airport covers an area of  it has two asphalt runways;

 Runway 6/24: 5,504 x 100 ft (1,678 x 30 m), ILS/DME equipped, with approved GPS approaches
 Runway 15/33: 3,297 x 75 ft (1,005 x 23 m), has approved GPS approaches.

For the 12-month period ending March 31, 2017, the airport had 40,555 aircraft operations, an average of 111 per day: 53% general aviation, 43% air taxi, 3% commercial, and <1% military. In November 2017, there were 72 aircraft based at this airport: 59 single engine, 12 multi-engine, and 1 helicopter.
The terminal has a restaurant, passenger holding areas, check-in desks, and a small luggage claim.  The ramp has the ability to hold up to 50 aircraft with about 15 spots reserved for commercial aviation.  The air traffic control tower is open from 6:00 am to 10:00 pm from May 15 - October 31, and from 7:00 am to 5:00 pm from November 1 to May 14. 

The airport apron for commercial aircraft has one parking stand which has the capacity for seven Cessna 402 or Tecnam P2012 aircraft, mainly operated by Cape Air and Nantucket Airlines. There are also five larger parking stands for JetBlue Embraer 190 or A220-300 aircraft, American Eagle Airlines CRJ-200/CRJ-700/CRJ-900, Embraer 175 regional jets, and American Airbus A319, Delta Connection CRJ-200/CRJ-700/CRJ-900, Embraer 175 regional jets, and Delta Airbus A319, and Elite Airways CRJ-200/CRJ-700/CRJ-900. 

During the summer months, a seasonal tent is added to the airport where all TSA checked passengers will be remain to wait for their flight as the terminal does not have a permanent waiting area. The tent has 2 gates for all airlines and can seat up to 150 people. They have a small baggage claim located on the left of the terminal, which is used for Cape Air year-round and JetBlue during summer months; other airlines will have baggage located at the side of the aircraft due to the small capacity of the baggage claim.

Operations
Along with the TSA, the West Tisbury Police Department is in charge of the security of the airport, and the ARFF department is staffed by 10 full-time firefighters. The airport currently operates several fully functional emergency response vehicles.

History

The airfield was built in 1942 as Naval Auxiliary Air Facility Martha's Vineyard (NAAF Martha's Vineyard) to support the training of naval aviators before their deployment to aircraft carriers in the Pacific Theater. Thousands of men received six weeks of intensive training there. The installation was renamed "'Naval Auxiliary Air Station Martha's Vineyard" in 1945, placed in caretaker status in 1946, and ultimately transferred to Dukes County in 1959. 

The new terminal building, constructed in 2001, replaced an older wooden structure that was the original base operations building. Historical photos and memorabilia are mounted on the western wall of the main hall, near the entrance to the restaurant, and tell the story of the Navy squadrons posted there during the war.

Major construction was made in the airport during the 21st century. One major project was to shift 200  ft of runway 6 - 24 and renovate taxiways to allow jets such as ERJ-190, and CRJ-200 to operate at the airport. The airport also renovated their commercial ramp, adding one spot for JetBlue ERJ-190, and Delta Airline ERJ-145, CRJ-200. They also renovated taxiways; they added a tent to meet demand on the terminal as they do not have a terminal building prepared for their demand.

During the years, American Airline stopped using their CRJ-200/CRJ-700/CRJ-900 to Martha's Vineyard because of demand and started using their ERJ-175 operated by Republic Airways. The airport renovated its ramp again in 2018, adding five spots jets to Airbus A220. In 2020 Delta airline switch using their CRJ-200/CRJ-700/CRJ-900 to ERJ-175 operated by Republic Airways.

In 2017 a new firefighter Department building was built next to the terminal building, replacing the old Naval building.

The airport also renovated and reconstructed its main runway 6 - 24 in 2018 - 2019; the project cost around $10 million, including adding NO TAXI Islands around the ramp. The runway was done and reopened in May 2019 with a Cape Air flight from Boston Logan to be the first aircraft to touch the new runway. In 2020 the airport repaved some areas on the ramp and added more markings.

During the COVID-19 pandemic, the airport saw a dramatic decline in passengers due to the pandemic the airport only saw 15,000 people passing thru their doors; American and Delta airlines resumed service in late June with their schedules operating by half of 2019, JetBlue resumed service back in July, but only with a concise schedule. It has been the most challenging year for the airport, but it go catch up with demand in late 2020 and early 2021.

In 2021 was the busiest year so far for the airport, as it had 65,992 passengers.

In 2022, Elite Airways pulled out Martha's Vineyard and left the airport with a space for a new airline, which still no airlines have any interest in. In January American Airlines announced that it would begin seasonal service between the island and Chicago, later on, they changed their summer schedule and added more flights to Washington D.C. In March 2022 Delta Airlines announced they would make 2x daily departures to John F. Kennedy International Airport and 1x daily departure to La Guardia Airport.

Later on, JetBlue reduced their summer schedule to the island to about 15% due to pilot shortage, which postponed their Newark route to resume after labor day, and cut some flights to John F. Kennedy International Airport. As a result, JetBlue is now scheduled to only operate 5x daily during the 2022 summer season.

The 2022 summer season at MVY was the busiest in the number of passengers. Delta Airlines increased their schedule to operate 4x daily on the 76 seats ERJ-175; they also extended their season till October 10th from flights to La Guardia Airport. All other airlines were operating at the same schedule level as 2021 expected for American Airlines, which increased their frenquecy to DCA airport up to 15x weekly and added a Saturday service to Chicago.

Expansion

In 2021, the airport created a Capital Improvement Plan that cites the airport's major problems during the peak summer months. The airport plans to renovate taxiways and the southeast and southwest ramps with new parking for aircraft. The airport is also looking at expanding those ramps to accommodate more general aviation aircraft. In addition, the airport is working to become 95% carbon-free in the future, which is adding electric chargers for the new Cape Air Eviation Alice aircraft.

The airport will create new hangars for aircraft maintenance and expand its terminal to accommodate the high summer demand.

Terminal

Martha's Vineyard Airport Terminal has one of the smallest terminals in Massachusetts, and it contains two gates, a restaurant, a ticket area, bathrooms, and baggage claim. The secure room during the summer month is an outdoor tent where all secure passengers will be waiting for the flight. The TSA at MVY only contains 1 area to screen all passengers simultaneously. The ticket area contains about 12 counts 2 for JetBlue, 2 for Delta Airline, 2 for American Airlines, 4 for Cape Air, and 2 for any future airlines. The baggage claim is located on the right side of the terminal, and it's located when the car rentals are located. The restaurant and the management building are located on the left side of the terminal. The restaurant is located before TSA, so there is no place for food after the TSA screening. Part of the building has pictures and airplane models of the airport in WWII.

Airlines and destinations

American Eagle operate E175 regional jets into Martha's Vineyard operated by Republic Airways. They operate seasonally from the 2nd week of June till the 2nd week of September, and some days operate up to 5x a day.

Cape Air/Nantucket Airlines operates the Cessna 402 and Tecnam P2012. They operate year-round, with some days operating 40 times a day at the airport in the summer season and some days operating 10 - 15 times a day in the winter.

Delta Connection (operated by Republic Airways)operates E175 regional jets to both New York–JFK and New York–LaGuardia. They operate seasonally from around Memorial Day till late October.

JetBlue operates the E190 to Martha's Vineyard. With the delay of the retirement of their E190, JetBlue does not have a definite date to start the operation of their A220-300 into MVY. They operate seasonally from May to October with flights up to 7x a day.

Tradewind Aviation operates the PC-12 into Martha's Vineyard. They operate 15 times a day in summer and five times or more during winter.

Cargo

FedEx Feeder offers a year-round flight from Providence, during summer months cargo flight can go up to 5 times a day and one time a day in the winter, all cargo continue to their FedEx facility at the airport and then into their trucks for delivery.

Cape Air offers cargo flights to Boston and Hyannis year-round and adds seasonal cargo flight to New Bedford. Cape Air cargo is dropped off in terminal C on Cape Air ticker area in Boston or in the main terminal ticket area in MVY for Cape Air.

Historical airline service

Northeast Airlines served Martha's Vineyard beginning in August 1944, when it acquired Mayflower Airlines. By the 1950s it was the dominant airline at the airport. Air New England served MVY from the 1970s until 1981; Provincetown-Boston Airline (PBA), operating as a feeder for Eastern Airlines, served MVY in the 1980s. Bridgeport-based Atlantic Air served MVY in the mid-1980s before merging into Business Express Airlines, which continued service to MVY under the Delta Connection brand. Other historical carriers at MVY included Bar Harbor Airlines, Brockway Air, Catskill Airways, Edgartown Air, Executive Airlines, Express Air, Gull Air, Holiday Airlines, Island Airlines, New Haven Airlines, New York Air, NorEast, Northern Airlines, Spectrum Airlines and Trans East Airlines.

Statistics

Top destinations

Airline market share

Annual traffic

Accidents and incidents

On January 30, 2001, a Cape Air pilot and his only passenger were injured when a Cessna 402C crashed just short of the Martha's Vineyard Airport on a flight from T. F. Green Airport in Warwick, Rhode Island.
On September 26, 2008, a repositioning flight with no passengers on board departed Martha's Vineyard at 8:05 pm en route to Boston. Shortly after takeoff from runway 33, the plane went down about two and a half miles from the airport, killing the pilot, who was the sole occupant. Prior to this date, Cape Air had maintained a fatality-free record over its 18-year history.

References

External links
 Martha's Vineyard Airport (official site)
 
 

Martha's Vineyard
Buildings and structures in Tisbury, Massachusetts
Airports in Dukes County, Massachusetts
Airports established in 1942
1942 establishments in Massachusetts